The Bachelor of Industrial Design (B.I.D.) is an undergraduate academic degree awarded by a university for a four-year course of study that specializes on the design of industrial products. Some colleges also offer four-year B.I.D. programs.

References

Industrial Design
Industrial design